Senator Horn may refer to:

Chuck Horn (fl. 1980s-2000s), Ohio State Senate
Fred Horn (1925–2018), Alabama State Senate
Frederick W. Horn (1815–1893), Wisconsin State Senate
John J. Horn (1917–1999), New Jersey State Senate
Kenneth Horn (born 1959), Michigan State Senate
Wally Horn (born 1933), Iowa State Senate

See also
Senator Horne (disambiguation)